Adžine Livade is a village in the Kragujevac municipality in the Šumadija District of central Serbia.

References

External links
Satellite map at Maplandia.com

Populated places in Šumadija District
Kragujevac